Lauren LaVera (born June 14) is an American actress and stunt performer. She is known for starring as Sienna Shaw in the 2022 slasher film Terrifier 2.

Early life 
LaVera was born in Philadelphia, Pennsylvania.

Career
LaVera's first leading role was as Sienna Shaw, a teenage girl that battles the supernatural serial killer Art the Clown in the 2022 slasher film Terrifier 2, alongside David Howard Thornton and Samantha Scaffidi. The film was well-received by critics, with praise directed at LaVera's performance. IGN's review said that LaVera "rules as Sienna in her angel-winged fantasy armor as a final girl fighting for family, facing her demons, and screaming bloody war cries in Art's mocking face," while Matthew Jackson of Paste wrote that "LaVera, tasked with injecting humanity into the sequel, lives up to this task with pure star power." LaVera will reprise her role as Sienna in Terrifier 3.

LaVera appeared in the mob film Not for Nothing, released in October 2022. In December 2022, LaVera was cast as Alessa, a pregnant woman whose antagonizing father disapproves of her relationship with her husband, in Joe Lam's 2023 horror film The Fetus, opposite Julian Curtis and Bill Moseley. In February 2023, Bloody Disgusting reported that LaVera would star as Lisa Gray in the supernatural thriller film The Well, directed by Federico Zampaglione.

Personal life 
LaVera is proficient in Taekwondo, Kun Khmer and Wushu.

Filmography

Film

Television

References

External links 

Living people
21st-century American actresses
American film actresses
Year of birth missing (living people)
American television actresses
Actresses from Philadelphia